Vladimir Vladimirovich Gerasimov (born 22 March 1975) is a Russian professional football coach and a former player. He is an assistant coach with FC Sakhalin Yuzhno-Sakhalinsk.

Playing career
As a player, he made his debut in the Russian Third Division in 1994 for FC Mashinostroitel Sergiyev Posad.

References

External links 
 Vladimir Gerasimov
 Profile at LevskiSofia.info

1975 births
People from Moscow Oblast
Living people
Russian footballers
PFC Krylia Sovetov Samara players
Russian Premier League players
PFC Cherno More Varna players
PFC Levski Sofia players
FC Kuban Krasnodar players
Russian football managers
FC Okean Nakhodka managers
Russian expatriate footballers
Expatriate footballers in Bulgaria
Russian expatriate sportspeople in Bulgaria
First Professional Football League (Bulgaria) players
FC Arsenal Tula players
Association football midfielders
Association football defenders
FC Sportakademklub Moscow players
Sportspeople from Moscow Oblast